Amreya is a city in Alexandria, Egypt. It contains an industrial zone with many factories and petroleum refineries.

See also 

 Neighborhoods in Alexandria

Populated places in Alexandria Governorate
Neighbourhoods of Alexandria